Bishopbriggs North and Campsie is one of the seven wards used to elect members of the East Dunbartonshire Council. It elects four Councillors.

The ward was created in 2017 following a boundary review, when the council's wards were reduced in number from eight to seven – most of the Bishopbriggs North and Torrance ward of 2007 was combined with the majority of the Campsie & Kirkintilloch North ward (Clachan of Campsie, Lennoxtown and Milton of Campsie) – the parts of Bishopbriggs between the Croy Line railway tracks and the Bishopbriggs Burn were re-assigned to the Bishopbriggs South ward, and the parts of Kirkintilloch north of the Forth and Clyde Canal were re-assigned to Lenzie and Kirkintilloch South. The new ward's territory borders the North Lanarkshire and Stirling local authority areas at either end of the Campsie Fells. In 2020, the ward had a population of 19,323.

Councillors

Election results

2022 election
2022 East Dunbartonshire Council election

2017 election
2017 East Dunbartonshire Council election

References

Wards of East Dunbartonshire
Lennoxtown
Bishopbriggs
2017 establishments in Scotland